RASD may refer to:
RasD, a protein
Sahrawi Arab Democratic Republic, a partially recognized state of Western Sahara
Rural Agency for Sustainable Development, an NGO located in the Mukono District of Uganda
Ridgway Area School District A rural school district in Northwestern Pennsylvania along the Allegany National Forest and the Clarion River.